William Barney may refer to:

 William J. Barney (1867–?), American miner involved in a labor dispute
 William Pope Barney (1890–1970), American architect